Patharighat, previously known as Patharughat, is a town & headquarter of eponymous revenue circle in Darrang district. It is 35 km northeast of Baruah Souk area of north Guwahati on northbank of Brahmaputra river. It is the site of memorial for the Patharughat massacre caused on 28 January 1894 by the British colonial rulers during the Patharughat peasant uprising, the day is commemorated as the Krishak Swahid Divas (Farmer Martyrs Day).

Battle of Patharughat & Patharughat massacre 

The place is famous for the event of 1894, popularly known as Patharughatar Ran (Battle of Patharughat) during the Patharughat peasant uprising against the exploitative colonial British raj. After the British annexation of Assam in 1826, surveys of the vast lands of the state began. On the basis of such surveys, the British began to impose land taxes, reportedly by 70-80 per cent, much to the resentment of the farmers, who previously paid taxes in-kind or provided service in lieu of cash.

The British authorities began to view the peasant protests and gatherings as grounds for sedition. On 28 January 1894 tempers flared as the authorities refused to listen to further grievances. A police lathi charge occurred followed by an open firing which left 15 peasants killed and 37 wounded according to official Raj records or 140 killed according to unofficial sources. Patharighat is known as Assam's Jallianwala Bagh. Since 2000, the army has been paying homage to the martyrs on 29 January every year, which is commemorated as the "Krishak Swahid Divas". Army has also set up martyrs' column in memory of those killed.

See also  

 List of massacres in India

References

Villages in Darrang district
History of Assam